The 1916 Cleveland Indians season was a season in American baseball. The team finished sixth in the American League with a record of 77–77, 14 games behind the Boston Red Sox.

Regular season

Season standings

Record vs. opponents

Notable transactions 
 April 12, 1916: Sad Sam Jones, Fred Thomas, and $55,000 were traded by the Indians to the Boston Red Sox for Tris Speaker.

Roster 
Beginning June 26, the Indians pioneered the use of uniform numbers on their home uniform jerseys, the first team to do so in MLB, the numbers were used up till the 1917 season. Uniform numbers, though, were not worn on the away uniforms.

Player stats

Batting

Starters by position 
Note: Pos = Position; G = Games played; AB = At bats; H = Hits; Avg. = Batting average; HR = Home runs; RBI = Runs batted in

Other batters 
Note: G = Games played; AB = At bats; H = Hits; Avg. = Batting average; HR = Home runs; RBI = Runs batted in

Pitching

Starting pitchers 
Note: G = Games pitched; IP = Innings pitched; W = Wins; L = Losses; ERA = Earned run average; SO = Strikeouts

Other pitchers 
Note: G = Games pitched; IP = Innings pitched; W = Wins; L = Losses; ERA = Earned run average; SO = Strikeouts

Relief pitchers 
Note: G = Games pitched; W = Wins; L = Losses; SV = Saves; ERA = Earned run average; SO = Strikeouts

Notes

References 
1916 Cleveland Indians season at Baseball Reference

Cleveland Guardians seasons
Cleveland Indians season
1916 in sports in Ohio